Nyhavn 49 is a listed property overlooking the Nyhavn Canal in central Copenhagen, Denmark.

History

17th century

The site was originally part of two separate properties. One of them was by 1689 as No. 27 in St. Ann's Quarter (Sankt Annæ Kvarter) owned by Marcus Rotsteen. The other one was by 1689 as No. 28 owned by tanner Villum Lydersen. Two adjoining sections of the two properties were by 1756 as No. 26 and No. 68 owned by skipper Jens Larsen.

The corner building was constructed as a warehouse for skipper Jens Karsen in 1744—46. The facade on Nyhavn featured a four-bay, rounded wall dormer with the '1744' over the windows. The facade on Toldbodgade featured a crow-stepped gable.

19th century

The property was later acquired by merchant and later bank manager Rasmus Kirketerp (1747-1830). At the time of the 1801 census, he resided in the building with his wife Elisabeth Bechmann and their five children (aged six to 18), an office clerk, a chachman, a caretaker, a chamber maid and three maids.

At the time of the 1834 census, Elisabeth Kirketerp resided on the ground floor with her 47-year old daughter Sidsel Magretha Kirketerp, a chamber maid, a male servant and two maids. One of her sons, Niels Kirketerp (1785-1855)., a merchant, resided on the second floor with his wife Erlandsine Fredr.Wandel, their five children (aged two to 11), the bookkeeper Søren Hastrup, a male servant and two maids.

The building was heightened with an extra floor in 1886. It was listed on the Danish Registry of Protected Buildings and Places in 132.

Today
Vaffelbageren, an ice cream parlour with homemade waffles, has been located in the high cellar since 1953. There are apartments on the upper floors.

References

External links

 Nyhavn 4p/Toldbodgade 2 at indenforvoldene.dk]

Listed residential buildings in Copenhagen